The Left-Hand Side of the Fridge was the first full-length feature film by Canadian film director Philippe Falardeau, released in 2000.

Synopsis
Shot in mockumentary style, the film stars Paul Ahmarani as Christophe and Stéphane Demers as Stéphane, two roommates sharing an apartment in Montreal. Christophe is an unemployed engineer, while Stéphane is a documentary filmmaker who begins filming Christophe's search for work. Christophe increasingly becomes disillusioned with the corporate world and fed up with the relentlessly intrusive nature of Stéphane and his omnipresent camera. Eventually he flees to Vancouver.

Awards
The film won the award for Best Canadian First Feature Film at the 2000 Toronto International Film Festival, as well as the Claude Jutra Award for the best Canadian film by a first-time director at the 21st Genie Awards.

Ahmarani won the Jutra Award for Best Actor at the 3rd Jutra Awards in 2001. Falardeau was also nominated for Best Director and Best Screenplay, and Sophie Leblond was nominated for Best Editing.

References

External links

2000 films
Canadian drama films
Films directed by Philippe Falardeau
2000s French-language films
Best First Feature Genie and Canadian Screen Award-winning films
Canadian mockumentary films
Films set in Montreal
2000 directorial debut films
French-language Canadian films
2000s Canadian films